Tomasz Czubak (born 16 December 1973 in Słupsk) is a former 400 metres runner from Poland. He won a silver medal in 4 x 400 metres relay at the 1998 European Championships and a gold medal at the 1999 World Championships in Athletics. Running in the 1999 individual contest, he set a personal best and a national record, with 44.62

Competition record

See also
 Polish records in athletics

Notes

External links

Polish male sprinters
1973 births
Living people
World Athletics Championships medalists
Sportspeople from Słupsk
European Athletics Championships medalists
Goodwill Games medalists in athletics
World Athletics Championships winners
Competitors at the 1998 Goodwill Games